Lost Canyons Golf Club was a public golf facility located in Simi Valley, California, USA. It has two 18-hole golf courses named Sky and Shadow. 

Both courses were designed by Pete Dye with consulting help from Fred Couples, and were named "Top 10 Best New Courses" by Golf Magazine (2001 Sky and 2002 Shadow). The golf club was developed by Landmark Land Co. Inc, a leading developer of golf resort and residential communities.

Lost Canyons Golf Club has suffered from several natural disasters over the years because of its topography and proximity to natural dry-brush. It was the victim of a wild fire that caused the destruction of many wood bridges and floods from heavy-rains that also took out the very same bridges that had been replaced. 

The club survived and even flourished during this attack from mother-nature and while the course was under-construction re-opened with a modified 18-holes by combining both the Sky and Shadow courses from those holes that were both playable and accessible via pathway and bridge. Today, neither course is open and operational. 

Lost Canyons LLC has filed a planned "conversion" proposal to replace one course with up to 364 upscale homes and turn the other course into a members-only private course.  This continues a recent trend among developers who have converted public courses into private development including Aliso Viejo Golf Club and Cypress Golf Club in California and the proposed Royal Links Golf Club in Nevada.

External links 
 Lost Canyons Golf Club

Simi Valley, California
Golf clubs and courses in California
Sports venues in Ventura County, California
Golf clubs and courses designed by Pete Dye
Geography of Simi Valley, California